The 1997 US Open was a tennis tournament played on outdoor hard courts at the USTA National Tennis Center in New York City in New York in the United States. It was the 117th edition of the US Open and was held from August 25 through September 7, 1997.

This was the first year to use Arthur Ashe Stadium as the primary stadium, replacing Louis Armstrong Stadium.

Seniors

Men's singles

 Patrick Rafter defeated  Greg Rusedski 6–3, 6–2, 4–6, 7–5
 It was Rafter's 1st career Grand Slam title and his 1st US Open title.

Women's singles

 Martina Hingis defeated  Venus Williams 6–0, 6–4
 It was Hingis' 3rd career Grand Slam title and her 1st US Open title.

Men's doubles

 Yevgeny Kafelnikov /  Daniel Vacek defeated  Jonas Björkman /  Nicklas Kulti 7–6(10–8), 6–3
 It was Kafelnikov's 4th career Grand Slam title and his only US Open title. It was Vacek's 3rd and last career Grand Slam title and his only US Open title.

Women's doubles

 Lindsay Davenport /  Jana Novotná defeated  Gigi Fernández /  Natasha Zvereva 6–3, 6–4
 It was Davenport's 2nd career Grand Slam title and her 1st US Open title. It was Novotná's 13th career Grand Slam title and her 3rd US Open title.

Mixed doubles

 Manon Bollegraf /  Rick Leach defeated  Mercedes Paz /  Pablo Albano 3–6, 7–5, 7–6(7–3)
 It was Bollegraf's 4th and last career Grand Slam title and her 2nd US Open title. It was Leach's 8th career Grand Slam title and his 2nd and last US Open title.

Juniors

Boys' singles

 Arnaud Di Pasquale defeated  Wesley Whitehouse 6–7, 6–4, 6–1

Girls' singles

 Cara Black defeated  Kildine Chevalier 6–7(5–7), 6–1, 6–3

Boys' doubles

 Fernando González /  Nicolás Massú defeated  Jean-René Lisnard /  Michaël Llodra 6–4, 6–4

Girls' doubles

 Marissa Irvin /  Alexandra Stevenson defeated  Cara Black /  Irina Selyutina 6–2, 7–6

External links
 Official US Open website

 
 

 
US Open
US Open (tennis) by year
US Open
US Open
US Open
US Open